Atmore Movie Theater also known as the Strand Theatre was a theatre located at 116 S. Main Street in Atmore, Alabama. It had been operating since around 1924 before it was closed in November 2013.

Reconstruction
In the theater's late days,  a lot of reconstruction was needed. A community group named Pride of Atmore came together to restore the old building. The theater underwent a complete interior and exterior renovation that added a new lobby, marquee, and theater area.

The building next door was home to a hardware store that stood for 122 years, and it was restored along with the theater. The Atmore Hardware building was renovated into a space for live music, rentals and community events. The cost of restoring both buildings came to over $3 million. The Pride of Atmore group used donations and grants from foundations and local businesses.

References

Theatres in Alabama
Buildings and structures in Escambia County, Alabama
1924 establishments in Alabama
2013 disestablishments in Alabama